Ezequiel Arana de Palacio (born 1 May 1986), simply known as Ezequiel, is a Spanish footballer who plays for Atlético Sanluqueño CF as a left back.

Club career
Born in El Puerto de Santa María, Province of Cádiz, Ezequiel graduated from local Cádiz CF's youth system, making his senior debuts with the reserves in the 2003–04 season. On 24 April 2004 he made his professional debut with the Andalusians' main squad, starting in a 2–2 away draw against Ciudad de Murcia in the Segunda División championship; in the 2005 summer he was loaned to Málaga CF B, also in the second tier.

In the following years Ezequiel competed in the Segunda División B and the Tercera División, representing Racing Club Portuense (two stints), Real Jaén, Puerto Real CF, Jerez Industrial CF, Atlético Sanluqueño CF, La Roda CF, San Fernando CD and Atlético Sanluqueño CF.

References

External links

1986 births
Living people
People from El Puerto de Santa María
Sportspeople from the Province of Cádiz
Spanish footballers
Footballers from Andalusia
Association football defenders
Segunda División players
Segunda División B players
Tercera División players
Cádiz CF B players
Cádiz CF players
Atlético Malagueño players
Real Jaén footballers
Jerez Industrial CF players
Atlético Sanluqueño CF players
Spain youth international footballers
La Roda CF players